Zoratkaran Parsabad Ardebil Football Club is an Iranian football club based in Parsabad, Iran. They currently compete in the 2011–12 Iran Football's 3rd Division.

During 2009–10 Hazfi Cup , This team lost their match against Esteghlal F.C. with 13-0 result at Azadi Stadium

Season-by-Season

The table below shows the achievements of the club in various competitions.

See also
 Hazfi Cup
 Iran Football's 3rd Division 2011–12

Football clubs in Iran
Association football clubs established in 2007
2007 establishments in Iran